Meşəkənarı is a village and municipality in the Masally Rayon of Azerbaijan. It has a population of 471.

References

Populated places in Masally District